KUJZ (95.3 FM, "Sports Radio, 95.3 The Score") is a commercial radio station licensed to Creswell, Oregon and broadcasting to the Eugene-Springfield, Oregon media market.  The station is owned by Cumulus Media and the broadcast license is held by Cumulus Licensing LLC.

KUJZ airs a sports radio format, with CBS Sports Radio programming most of the day and a nightly local call-in show focusing on University of Oregon teams.  Nationally syndicated shows from Dan Patrick and Jim Rome are heard on weekdays.  KUJZ is the Eugene outlet for Oregon Ducks football and basketball broadcasts as well as Seattle Seahawks football.

History
The station came on the air in 1985 as KZAM-FM with an adult album alternative format.  In late 1988, KZAM-FM changed to a satellite-fed “Pure Gold” Oldies format.  In 1990, new owners changed the call letters to KAVE and started a new adult album alternative format as “95.3 The KAVE.” In 1993, the format changed to the satellite-fed “Z-Rock” simulcasting with AM 1320 KZZK.  95.3's call letters were changed to KZZK-FM.  In 1995, the format changed to alternative rock as “New Rock 95.3 NRQ” with new call letters KNRQ-FM.  In 2001, after KNRQ's format and call letters moved to 97.9 (the former KKTT) the station changed to Eugene's Smooth Jazz, 95.3 KUJZ.  In 2004, it changed to country as “95.3 The Moose” with a jock-less approach.  In 2009, KUJZ dropped country and picked up AM 1320 KSCR's sports format.

Previous logos

References

External links
KUJZ official website

UJZ
ESPN Radio stations
Radio stations established in 1985
CBS Sports Radio stations
1985 establishments in Oregon
Cumulus Media radio stations
Creswell, Oregon